The 1933 Utah Utes football team was an American football team that represented the University of Utah as a member of the Rocky Mountain Conference (RMC) during the 1933 college football season. In their ninth season under head coach Ike Armstrong, the Utes compiled an overall record of 5–3 with a mark of 5–1 in conference play, shared the RMC title with Colorado Agricultural and Denver, and outscored opponents by a total of 129 to 78.

Before losing to Denver on November 18, Utah had won 30 consecutive conference games dating back to the 1928 season and had not lost a conference game or any game played in the Rocky Mountain region since the 1927 season.

Schedule

References

Utah
Utah Utes football seasons
Rocky Mountain Athletic Conference football champion seasons
Utah Utes football